Claudetite is an arsenic oxide mineral with chemical formula As2O3. Claudetite is formed as an oxidation product of arsenic sulfides and is colorless or white. It can be associated with arsenolite (the cubic form of As2O3) as well as realgar (As4S4), orpiment (As2S3) and native sulfur.

It was first described in 1868 for an occurrence in the San Domingo mines, Algarve, Portugal. It was first described by and named for the French chemist Frederick Claudet.

References 

Arsenic minerals
Oxide minerals
Monoclinic minerals
Minerals in space group 14